Paracelsus (c. 1493–1531) was a Swiss physician, alchemist, lay theologian, and philosopher of the German Renaissance.

Paracelsus may also refer to:
 Paracelsus (poem), a poem by Robert Browning
 Paracelsus (film), a 1943 German drama film
 Paracelsus (crater), an impact crater on the moon's far side
 Paracelsus Medical University, a private university located in Salzburg municipality, Austria and Nuremberg, Germany
Paracelsus-Bad (Berlin U-Bahn), a Berlin U-Bahn station.